Darb-e Emamzadeh (also Romanized as Darb-e Emāmzādeh) is a village in Ij Rural District, in the Central District of Estahban County, Fars Province, Iran. At the 2006 census, its population was 454, in 113 families.

References 

Populated places in Estahban County